"I Missed the Bus" is a song by American hip-hop duo Kris Kross. It was released in September 1992 as the third single from their debut album, Totally Krossed Out (1992).

Release
"I Missed the Bus" was the third single from Totally Krossed Out, following "Jump" and "Warm It Up", both of which made it to #1 on the Billboard Hot Rap Singles chart. Though the single was not as successful as the group's previous two, "I Missed the Bus" managed to make it to #14 on the Hot Rap Singles chart and #63 on the Billboard Hot 100.  The song was written and produced by Jermaine Dupri.  It contains samples from the song "Keep Your Eye on the Sparrow" which was performed by Sammy Davis, Jr.

Critical reception
In his review of the album, Steve Huey from AllMusic viewed the song as "self-explanatory". Larry Flick from Billboard commented, "Currently in the midst of its first U.S. concert tour, kid duo digs into its triple-platinum debut, "Totally Krossed Out", and pulls out a contagious anthem that is (gratefully) not as derivative of "Jump" as the previous "Warm It Up". Pro-education message is well-timed with back-to-school season and should click with teen audiences."

Music video
The song's music video, which received heavy play on MTV and BET, employs satirical horror movie imagery to illustrate the anxiety of missing the bus and being late for school.  The bus driver is depicted as a dancing zombie with rotting, mottled flesh.  A female school teacher appears as a bizarre creature with compound eyes, reminiscent of the protagonist of The Fly films, while her students are catatonic, nodding drones, covered in cobwebs and hypnotized by her powers.  Dupri appears as a magistrate in a judicial wig, convicting the tardy duo in a kangaroo court, pounding a gavel and occasionally scratching turntables.

Track listing
"I Missed the Bus" (Backwards To School Radio Version)- 3:00
"I Missed the Bus" (School Crossing Mix)- 2:56

Charts

References

External links

1992 singles
Kris Kross songs
Songs written by Jermaine Dupri
Song recordings produced by Jermaine Dupri
1992 songs
Ruffhouse Records singles